Sunnyside is an American sitcom created by Kal Penn and Matt Murray. The series premiered on September 26, 2019 on NBC. The series is produced by Panther Co., Fremulon, 3 Arts Entertainment in association with Universal Television, with Penn and Murray serving as showrunners. On October 15, 2019, it was announced that NBC had pulled further episodes of the series from the air, and that the eleventh and final season of Will & Grace, initially held for midseason, premiered in its timeslot. It was the first network television cancellation of the 2019–20 television season. The remaining episodes have been released online on the NBC app/NBC.com and other video on-demand platforms.

Premise 
Set in Sunnyside, Queens in New York City, the series follows Garrett Modi, a fictional former New York City Councilman, who finds his calling when faced with immigrants in need of his help and in search of the American Dream.

Cast

Main 
 Kal Penn as Garrett Modi (named for Edna Garrett), a self-absorbed former city councilman removed from office after being charged with bribing a police officer. He now helps a group of immigrants receive permanent legal status in the United States while trying to improve himself as a person. 
 Diana-Maria Riva as Griselda, a Dominican immigrant, married to a U.S. citizen. A running joke is that she works an unreasonable number of jobs, often in seemingly random places.
 Poppy Liu as Mei Lin, a member of a wealthy Asian family, on an EB-5 visa, seeking U.S. citizenship.
 Joel Kim Booster as Jun Ho, Mei Lin's brother, also on an EB-5 visa and seeking U.S. citizenship.
 Moses Storm as Bojan/Brady, born in Moldova and brought to the U.S. by his parents at age 2, enrolled in Deferred Action for Childhood Arrivals, seeking legal status in the U.S.
 Samba Schutte as Hakim, an Ethiopian immigrant, formerly a cardiothoracic surgeon in Ethiopia and currently a taxicab driver because he is not licensed to practice medicine in the U.S.
 Kiran Deol as Mallory Modi (named for Mallory Keaton), Garrett's sister, a successful doctor.

Recurring 
 Ana Villafañe as Diana Barea, the idealistic, competent councilwoman elected to replace Garrett.
 Tudor Petrut as Drazen Barbu, an amateur DJ and immigrant from Moldova.
 Nick Gracer as Stanislav, a Moldovan immigrant and owner of a corner store who's known Brady since he was a child.

Guest 
 John Michael Higgins as Wallace Furley, a professional con artist posing as an immigration lawyer ("The Ethiopian Executioner").
 Beck Bennett as Tripp Henson, a cable news host and old friend of Garrett's who spars with Diana ("Schnorf Town").
 Fortune Feimster as Michelle Pinholster, Griselda's wife ("Pants Full of Sandwiches").
 Natalie Morales as Celeste, Garrett's ex-girlfriend ("Pants Full of Sandwiches").

Episodes

Production

Development 
On January 28, 2019, it was announced that NBC had given the production a pilot order. The pilot was written by Kal Penn who executive produces alongside Matt Murray, Michael Schur, David Miner and Dan Spilo. Production companies involved with the pilot include 3 Arts Entertainment and Universal Television. In March 2019, the pilot project was titled Sunnyside. On May 6, 2019, it was announced that the production had been given a series order, together with Bluff City Law. A day after that, it was announced that the series would premiere in the fall of 2019 and air on Thursday night entry in the 2019–2020 television season at 9:30 p.m. The series made its debut on September 26, 2019.

Casting 
In March 2019, it was announced that seven co-leads opposite Kal Penn, including Kiran Deol, Moses Storm, Diana Maria Riva, Samba Schutte, Poppy Liu, Joel Kim Booster and Tudor Petrut had been cast in the pilot's lead roles.

Release 
On May 12, 2019, NBC released the first official trailer for the series.

Reception
On review aggregation website Rotten Tomatoes, the series holds an approval rating of 36% with an average rating of 5.33/10, based on 11 reviews. The website's critical consensus reads, "Though it has many of the right ingredients—like a superb cast and timely subject matter,—Sunnyside can't quite bring them together in a satisfying way, settling for broad comedy over the specific insights that its subject matter craves." Metacritic, which uses a weighted average, assigned the series a score of 58 out of 100 based on 8 critics, indicating "mixed or average reviews".

Cancellation
On October 15, 2019, NBC removed Sunnyside from its broadcast schedule, due to low ratings. NBC ordered an eleventh episode of Sunnyside, and the final seven episodes were released on digital platforms. Will & Grace replaced Sunnyside on the broadcast schedule.

References

External links 

2019 American television series debuts
2019 American television series endings
2010s American single-camera sitcoms
English-language television shows
NBC original programming
Television series by Fremulon
Television series by 3 Arts Entertainment
Television series by Universal Television
Television shows set in New York City
Television series about immigration
Works about immigration to the United States
Sunnyside, Queens